The 2010–11 Argentine Primera C Metropolitana is the season of fourth division professional of football in Argentina. A total of 20 teams will compete; the champion will be promoted to Primera B Metropolitana.

Club information

Table

Standings

Torneo Reducido

Relegation

Tiebreaker

|-

|-
|}

Relegation Playoff Matches

|-

|-
|}

See also
2010–11 in Argentine football

References

External links
List of Argentine second division champions by RSSSF
Futbol de Ascenso Primera C 

Primera C seasons
4